Single cell may refer to:

Biology
Single-cell organism
Single-cell protein
Single-cell recording, a neuro-electric monitoring technique
Single-cell sequencing
Single cell epigenomics
Single-cell transcriptomics, a technique in molecular biology

Other uses
Single-cell thunderstorm, a pulse storm
Single Cell (comic), a 2001 story in Star Wars Tales
Single Cell Orchestra, the performing name of Miguel Fierro
Single Cell Orchestra (album), a 1996 music album
An electric battery of one cell
Single-celling, separation of prison inmates